Pilgrim Congregational Church is a historic church building at 540-544 Columbia Road in the Dorchester neighborhood of Boston, Massachusetts. The brick Romanesque Revival building was built 1890–1893 to a design by Worcester architect Stephen C. Earle. The congregation for which it was built was established in 1862; this was its second purpose-built church. The congregation was divided when the Romsey Congregational Church was established in 1893 to serve congregants living closer to Savin Hill; the two congregations were reunited in 1930, and stained glass windows from the Romsey Church were installed in this building.

The Pilgrim Church was subjected to a severely damaging fire in October 1970. Although it was restricted to the sanctuary, there was extensive water and smoke damage, and five stained glass windows (including the three from the Romsey Church) were destroyed. The congregation decided to rebuild the main sanctuary as a multipurpose fellowship hall, and now worships in the chapel.

The church was listed on the National Register of Historic Places in 2013.

See also
National Register of Historic Places listings in southern Boston, Massachusetts

References

Churches completed in 1893
Congregational churches in Boston
Churches on the National Register of Historic Places in Massachusetts
Dorchester, Boston
National Register of Historic Places in Boston